In mathematics, Bäcklund transforms or Bäcklund transformations (named after the Swedish mathematician Albert Victor Bäcklund) relate partial differential equations and their solutions. They are an important tool in soliton theory and integrable systems. A Bäcklund transform is typically a system of first order partial differential equations relating two functions, and often depending on an additional parameter. It implies that the two functions separately satisfy partial differential equations, and each of the two functions is then said to be a Bäcklund transformation of the other.

A Bäcklund transform which relates solutions of the same equation is called an invariant Bäcklund transform or auto-Bäcklund transform.  If such a transform can be found, much can be deduced about the solutions of the equation especially if the Bäcklund transform contains a parameter. However, no systematic way of finding Bäcklund transforms is known.

History 

Bäcklund transforms have their origins in differential geometry: the first nontrivial example is the transformation of pseudospherical surfaces introduced by L. Bianchi and A.V. Bäcklund in the 1880s. This is a geometrical construction of a new pseudospherical surface from an initial such surface using a solution of a linear differential equation. Pseudospherical surfaces can be described as solutions of the sine-Gordon equation, and hence the Bäcklund transformation of surfaces can be viewed as a transformation of solutions of the sine-Gordon equation.

The Cauchy–Riemann equations

The prototypical example of a Bäcklund transform is the Cauchy–Riemann system

This first order system of partial differential equations has the following properties.

Thus, in this case, a Bäcklund transformation of a harmonic function is just a conjugate harmonic function.

These are the characteristic features of a Bäcklund transform.

Bäcklund transforms are most interesting when just one of the three equations is linear.

The sine-Gordon equation

Suppose that u is a solution of the sine-Gordon equation

Then the system

where a is an arbitrary parameter, is solvable for a function v which will also satisfy the sine-Gordon equation. This is an example of an auto-Bäcklund transform.

By using a matrix system, it is also possible to find a linear Bäcklund transform for solutions of sine-Gordon equation.

The Liouville equation

A Bäcklund transform can turn a non-linear partial differential equation into a simpler, linear, partial differential equation.

For example, if u and v are related via the Bäcklund transform

where a is an arbitrary parameter, and if u is a solution of the Liouville equation

then v is a solution of the much simpler equation, and vice versa.

We can then solve the (non-linear) Liouville equation by working with a much simpler linear equation.

See also 
 Integrable system
 Korteweg–de Vries equation
 Darboux transformation

References 

 
 
 , excerpt
 A. D. Polyanin and V. F. Zaitsev, Handbook of Nonlinear Partial Differential Equations, Chapman & Hall/CRC Press, 2004.

External links 
 
  

Differential geometry
Solitons
Exactly solvable models
Surfaces
Transforms
Integrable systems